The 1818–19 United States House of Representatives elections were held on various dates in various states between April 26, 1818 and August 12, 1819. Each state set its own date for its elections to the House of Representatives before the first session of the 16th United States Congress convened on December 6, 1819. They occurred during President James Monroe's first term. Also, newly admitted Alabama elected its first representatives in September 1819, increasing the size of the House to 186 seats.

This election occurred in a politically uneventful period marked by exceptionally low levels of partisan rivalry known as the Era of Good Feelings. The weak Federalist Party, with limited influence in few states, no longer effectively opposed the Democratic-Republican Party, which increased its large majority.

Election summaries 
Illinois was admitted in 1818, adding one seat.

Alabama and Maine were admitted during the 16th Congress. One new seat was added for Alabama, while Maine, splitting from Massachusetts, simply retained its Representatives.

Special elections 

There were special elections in 1818 and 1819 to the 15th United States Congress and 16th United States Congress.

Special elections are sorted by date then district.

15th Congress 

|-
! 
| Uriel Holmes
|  | Federalist
| 1816
|  | Incumbent resigned sometime in 1818.New member elected before November 1818.Democratic-Republican gain.Successor seated November 16, 1818.Successor was not a candidate for the next term, see below.
| nowrap | 

|-
! 
| colspan=3 | Vacant
|  | Member-elect Alexander McMillan died before this Congress began.New member elected January 1, 1818.Democratic-Republican gain.Successor seated January 26, 1818.Successor later lost re-election, see below.
| nowrap | 

|-
! 
| John C. Calhoun
|  | Democratic-Republican
| 1810
|  | Incumbent resigned November 3, 1817 to become U.S. Secretary of War.New member elected in January 1818.Democratic-Republican hold.Successor seated February 9, 1818.Successor later re-elected, see below.
| nowrap | 

|-
! 
| Albion K. Parris
|  | Democratic-Republican
| 1814
|  | Incumbent resigned February 3, 1818.New member elected March 16, 1818.Democratic-Republican hold.Successor later re-elected, see below.Successor seated November 16, 1818.
| nowrap | 

|-
! 
| John Ross
|  | Democratic-Republican
| 1808
|  | Incumbent resigned February 24, 1818 to become President Judge of Pennsylvania's 7th Judicial Circuit.New member elected March 3, 1818.Democratic-Republican hold.Successor seated March 24, 1818.Successor resigned July 6, 1818, see below.
| nowrap | 

|-
! 
| Jacob Spangler
|  | Democratic-Republican
| 1816
|  | Incumbent resigned April 20, 1818.New member elected Between April and November 1818.Democratic-Republican hold.Successor seated November 16, 1818.Successor also elected to the next term, see below.
| nowrap | 

|-
! 
| Thomas B. Robertson
|  | Democratic-Republican
| 1812
|  | Incumbent resigned April 20, 1818.New member elected July 6–8, 1818.Democratic-Republican hold.Successor seated November 16, 1818.Successor elected the same day to the next term, see below.
| nowrap | 

|-
! 
| Samuel D. Ingham
|  | Democratic-Republican
| 1818 
|  | Incumbent resigned July 6, 1818.New member elected October 13, 1818.Democratic-Republican hold.Successor also elected the same day to the next term, see below.Successor seated November 16, 1818.
| nowrap | 

|-
! 
| Daniel Forney
|  | Democratic-Republican
| 1815
|  | Incumbent resigned sometime in 1818.New member elected November 7, 1818.Federalist gain.Successor seated December 2, 1818.Successor later re-elected, see below.
| nowrap | 

|-
! 
| Peterson Goodwyn
|  | Democratic-Republican
| 1803
|  | Incumbent died February 21, 1818.New member elected November 16, 1818.Democratic-Republican hold.Successor seated April 21, 1818.Successor later lost re-election, see below.
| nowrap | 

|-
! 
| John Forsyth
|  | Democratic-Republican
| 1812
|  | Incumbent resigned November 23, 1818 when elected U.S. Senator.New member elected January 4, 1819 both to finish the term and to the next term.Democratic-Republican hold.Successor seated February 18, 1819.
| nowrap | 

|-
! 
| George Mumford
|  | Democratic-Republican
| 1817
|  | Incumbent died December 31, 1818.New member elected between January 1, 1819 and February 11, 1819.Democratic-Republican gain.Successor seated February 11, 1819.Successor was later re-elected to the next term, see below.
| nowrap | 

|}

16th Congress 

|-
| colspan=6 | 

|}

Alabama 

|-
! 
| colspan=3 | New seat
|  | Alabama was admitted as a state December 14, 1819.Incumbent territorial delegate re-elected as member.Democratic-Republican gain.New member seated December 14, 1819.
| nowrap | 

|}

Alabama Territory 
See Non-voting delegates, below.

Arkansas Territory 
See Non-voting delegates, below.

Connecticut 

Connecticut elected its members September 21, 1818. The delegation changed from seven Federalists to seven Democratic-Republicans then the retirement of six incumbents and the party-change of the seventh.

|-
! rowspan=7 | 
| Ebenezer Huntington
|  | Federalist
| 1817 
|  | Incumbent retired.New member elected.Democratic-Republican gain.
| rowspan=7 nowrap | 

|-
| Jonathan O. Moseley
|  | Federalist
| 1804
|  | Incumbent changed parties and re-elected.Democratic-Republican gain.

|-
| Samuel B. Sherwood
|  | Federalist
| 1816
|  | Incumbent retired.New member elected.Democratic-Republican gain.

|-
| Timothy Pitkin
|  | Federalist
| 1805 
|  | Incumbent retired.New member elected.Democratic-Republican gain.

|-
| Nathaniel Terry
|  | Federalist
| 1817 
|  | Incumbent retired.New member elected.Democratic-Republican gain.

|-
| Thomas Scott Williams
|  | Federalist
| 1816
|  | Incumbent retired.New member elected.Democratic-Republican gain.

|-
| Uriel Holmes
|  | Federalist
| 1816
|  | Incumbent resigned sometime in 1818.New member elected.Democratic-Republican gain.Successor was not elected to finish the term.

|}

Delaware 

Delaware elected its members October 5, 1818.

|-
! rowspan=2 | 
| Louis McLane
|  | Federalist
| 1816
| Incumbent re-elected.
| rowspan=2 nowrap | 

|-
| Willard Hall
|  | Democratic-Republican
| 1816
| Incumbent re-elected.

|}

Georgia 

Georgia elected its members October 5, 1818.

|-
! rowspan=6 | 
| William Terrell
|  | Democratic-Republican
| 1816
| Incumbent re-elected.
| rowspan=6 nowrap | 

|-
| Joel Crawford
|  | Democratic-Republican
| 1816
| Incumbent re-elected.

|-
| Joel Abbot
|  | Democratic-Republican
| 1816
| Incumbent re-elected.

|-
| Zadock Cook
|  | Democratic-Republican
| 1816 
|  | Incumbent retired.New member elected.Democratic-Republican hold.

|-
| John Forsyth
|  | Democratic-Republican
| 1812
| Incumbent re-elected but declined the seat and resigned November 23, 1818, having been elected U.S. Senator, leading to a special election.

|-
| Thomas W. Cobb
|  | Democratic-Republican
| 1816
| Incumbent re-elected.

|}

Illinois 

Illinois elected its member August 2, 1819, after the new congress began but before the first session convened. The incumbent had just been elected to the new seat in late 1818.

15th Congress 

|-
! 
| colspan=3 | None (District created)
|  | Illinois was admitted December 3, 1818.New member elected in 1818.Democratic-Republican gain.New member seated December 4, 1818 to finish the term ending March 3, 1819.The next year, the new member lost re-election, see below.
| nowrap | 

|}

16th Congress 

|-
! 
| John McLean
|  | Democratic-Republican
| 1818
|  | Incumbent lost re-election.New member elected.Democratic-Republican hold.
| nowrap | 

|}

Indiana 

Indiana re-elected its member August 3, 1818.

|-
! 
| William Hendricks
|  | Democratic-Republican
| 1816
| Incumbent re-elected.
| nowrap | 

|}

Kentucky 

Kentucky elected its members August 3, 1818.

|-
! 
| David Trimble
|  | Democratic-Republican
| 1816
| Incumbent re-elected.
| nowrap | 

|-
! 
| Henry Clay
|  | Democratic-Republican
| 18101814 18141815 (Seat declared vacant)1815 
| Incumbent re-elected.
| nowrap | 

|-
! 
| Richard M. Johnson
|  | Democratic-Republican
| 1806
|  | Incumbent retired.New member elected.Democratic-Republican hold.
| nowrap | 

|-
! 
| Joseph Desha
|  | Democratic-Republican
| 1806
|  | Incumbent lost re-election.New member elected.Democratic-Republican hold.
| nowrap | 

|-
! 
| Anthony New
|  | Democratic-Republican
| 18101814 1816
|  | Incumbent retired.New member elected.Democratic-Republican hold.
| nowrap | 

|-
! 
| David Walker
|  | Democratic-Republican
| 1816
| Incumbent re-elected.
| nowrap | 

|-
! 
| George Robertson
|  | Democratic-Republican
| 1816
| Incumbent re-elected.
| nowrap | 

|-
! 
| Richard C. Anderson Jr.
|  | Democratic-Republican
| 1816
| Incumbent re-elected.
| nowrap | 

|-
! 
| Tunstall Quarles
|  | Democratic-Republican
| 1816
| Incumbent re-elected.
| nowrap | 

|-
! 
| Thomas Speed
|  | Democratic-Republican
| 1816
|  | Incumbent retired.New member elected.Democratic-Republican hold.
| nowrap | 

|}

Louisiana 

Louisiana elected its member July 6–8, 1818.

Louisiana held an election for the 16th Congress at the same time that it held a special election to finish the 15th Congress. Data were only available for the special election, but the general election would presumably have had very similar results, and so the results for the special election are duplicated here.

|-
! 
| Thomas B. Robertson
|  | Democratic-Republican
| 1812
|  | Incumbent resigned April 20, 1818.New member elected.Democratic-Republican hold.Successor elected the same day to finish the current term, see above.
| nowrap | 

|}

Maryland 

Maryland elected its members October 5, 1818.

|-
! 
| Philip Stuart
|  | Federalist
| 1810
|  | Incumbent retired.New member elected.Federalist hold.
| nowrap | 

|-
! 
| John C. Herbert
|  | Federalist
| 1814
|  | Incumbent retired.New member elected.Democratic-Republican gain.
| nowrap | 

|-
! 
| George Peter
|  | Federalist
| 1816
|  | Incumbent lost re-election.New member elected.Federalist hold.
| nowrap | 

|-
! 
| Samuel Ringgold
|  | Democratic-Republican
| 18101814 1816
| Incumbent re-elected.
| nowrap | 

|-
! rowspan=2 | 
| Samuel Smith
|  | Democratic-Republican
| 17921803 1816
| Incumbent re-elected.
| rowspan=2 nowrap | 

|-
| Peter Little
|  | Democratic-Republican
| 18101812 1816
| Incumbent re-elected.

|-
! 
| Philip Reed
|  | Democratic-Republican
| 1816
|  | Incumbent lost re-election.New member elected.Democratic-Republican hold.
| nowrap | 

|-
! 
| Thomas Culbreth
|  | Democratic-Republican
| 1816
| Incumbent re-elected.
| nowrap | 

|-
! 
| Thomas Bayly
|  | Federalist
| 1816
| Incumbent re-elected.
| nowrap | 

|}

Massachusetts 

Massachusetts elected its members November 2, 1818. Massachusetts's electoral law required a majority for election, n  Massachusetts's electoral law required a majority for electionMassachusetts's electoral law required a majority for electionecessitating additional elections in five districts on April 5, 1819 and July 26, 1819.

This was the last election in which the District of Maine — comprising congressional districts 14 through 20 — was part of Massachusetts. The District became the State of Maine during the 16th Congress.

District numbers differed between source used and elsewhere on Wikipedia; district numbers used elsewhere on Wikipedia used here.

|-
! 
| Jonathan Mason
|  | Federalist
| 1817 
| Incumbent re-elected.
| nowrap | 

|-
! 
| Nathaniel Silsbee
|  | Democratic-Republican
| 1816
| Incumbent re-elected.
| nowrap | 

|-
! 
| Jeremiah Nelson
|  | Federalist
| 18041806 1814
| Incumbent re-elected.
| nowrap | 

|-
! 
| Timothy Fuller
|  | Democratic-Republican
| 1816
| Incumbent re-elected.
| nowrap | 

|-
! 
| Elijah H. Mills
|  | Federalist
| 1814
|  | Incumbent retired.New member elected.Federalist hold.
| nowrap | 

|-
! 
| Samuel C. Allen
|  | Federalist
| 1816
| Incumbent re-elected.
| nowrap | 

|-
! 
| Henry Shaw
|  | Democratic-Republican
| 1816
| Incumbent re-elected.
| nowrap | 

|-
! 
| Zabdiel Sampson
|  | Democratic-Republican
| 1816
| Incumbent re-elected.
| nowrap | 

|-
! 
| Walter Folger Jr.
|  | Democratic-Republican
| 1816
| Incumbent re-elected.
| nowrap | 

|-
! 
| Marcus Morton
|  | Democratic-Republican
| 1816
| Re-elected 
| nowrap | 

|-
! 
| Benjamin Adams
|  | Federalist
| 1816
| Incumbent re-elected.
| nowrap | 

|-
! 
| Solomon Strong
|  | Federalist
| 1814
|  | Incumbent retired.New member elected.Federalist hold.
| nowrap | 

|-
! 
| Nathaniel Ruggles
|  | Federalist
| 1812
|  | Incumbent lost re-election.New member elected.Democratic-Republican gain.
| nowrap | 

|-
! 
| John Holmes
|  | Democratic-Republican
| 1816
| Incumbent re-elected.
| nowrap | 

|-
! 
| Ezekiel Whitman
|  | Federalist
| 18081810 1816
| Incumbent re-elected.
| nowrap | 

|-
! 
| Benjamin Orr
|  | Federalist
| 1816
|  | Incumbent lost re-election.New member elected.Democratic-Republican gain.
| nowrap | 

|-
! 
| John Wilson
|  | Federalist
| 1816
|  | Incumbent lost re-election.New member elected.Democratic-Republican gain.
| nowrap | 

|-
! 
| Thomas Rice
|  | Federalist
| 1814
|  | Incumbent lost re-election.New member elected.Democratic-Republican gain.
| nowrap | 

|-
! 
| Joshua Gage
|  | Democratic-Republican
| 1816
| nowrap | 

|-
! 
| Enoch Lincoln
|  | Democratic-Republican
| 1818 
| Incumbent re-elected.
| nowrap | 

|}

Michigan Territory 
See Non-voting delegates, below.

Mississippi 

Mississippi elected its member August 2–3, 1819, after the new congress began but before the first session convened.

|-
! 
| George Poindexter
|  | Democratic-Republican
| 1817
|  | Incumbent retired.New member elected.Democratic-Republican hold.
| nowrap | 

|}

Missouri Territory 
See Non-voting delegates, below.

New Hampshire 

New Hampshire elected its members March 9, 1819, after the new congress began but before the first session convened.

|-
! rowspan=6 | 
| Josiah Butler
|  | Democratic-Republican
| 1816
| Incumbent re-elected.
| rowspan=6 nowrap | 

|-
| Nathaniel Upham
|  | Democratic-Republican
| 1816
| Incumbent re-elected.

|-
| Clifton Clagett
|  | Democratic-Republican
| 18021804 1816
| Incumbent re-elected.

|-
| Salma Hale
|  | Democratic-Republican
| 1816
|  | Incumbent retired.New member elected.Democratic-Republican hold.

|-
| John F. Parrott
|  | Democratic-Republican
| 1816
|  | Incumbent retired.New member elected.Democratic-Republican hold.

|-
| Arthur Livermore
|  | Democratic-Republican
| 1816
| Incumbent re-elected.

|}

New Jersey 

New Jersey elected its members October 13, 1818.

|-
! rowspan=6 | 
| John Linn
|  | Democratic-Republican
| 1816
| Incumbent re-elected.
| rowspan=6 nowrap | 

|-
| Charles Kinsey
|  | Democratic-Republican
| 1816
|  | Incumbent lost re-election.New member elected.Democratic-Republican hold.

|-
| Henry Southard
|  | Democratic-Republican
| 1814
| Incumbent re-elected.

|-
| Ephraim Bateman
|  | Democratic-Republican
| 1814
| Incumbent re-elected.

|-
| Joseph Bloomfield
|  | Democratic-Republican
| 1816
| Incumbent re-elected.

|-
| Benjamin Bennet
|  | Democratic-Republican
| 1814
|  | Incumbent lost re-election.New member elected.Democratic-Republican hold.

|}

New York 

New York elected its members April 28–30, 1818, the earliest of any state.

At this time, the Democratic-Republicans in New York were divided into two factions, the "Bucktails" who were opposed to Governor Dewitt Clinton's Erie Canal project, led by Martin Van Buren, and on the other side, Clinton's supporters, known as Clintonians. In many districts, the remaining Federalists allied with the Clintonians, with candidates running on a joint ticket. Several candidates who ran under that joint ticket cannot be clearly categorized, and are marked C/F. Others who ran under the joint ticket are marked by their party with a footnote indicating that they ran under the joint ticket.

|-
! rowspan=2 | 
| George Townsend
|  | Democratic-Republican
| 1814
|  | Incumbent retired.New member elected.Federalist gain.Election later disputed in favor of James Guyon Jr.
| rowspan=2 nowrap | 

|-
| Tredwell Scudder
|  | Democratic-Republican
| 1816
|  | Incumbent retired.New member elected.Democratic-Republican hold.

|-
! rowspan=2 | 
| William Irving
|  | Democratic-Republican
| 1813 
|  | Incumbent retired.New member elected.Democratic-Republican hold.
| rowspan=2 nowrap | 

|-
| Peter H. Wendover
|  | Democratic-Republican
| 1814
| Incumbent re-elected.

|-
! 
| Caleb Tompkins
|  | Democratic-Republican
| 1816
| Incumbent re-elected.
| nowrap | 

|-
! 
| James Tallmadge Jr.
|  | Democratic-Republican
| 1817 
|  | Incumbent retired.New member elected.Federalist gain.
| nowrap | 

|-
! 
| Philip J. Schuyler
|  | Federalist
| 1816
|  | Incumbent retired.New member elected.Federalist hold.
| nowrap | 

|-
! 
| James W. Wilkin
|  | Democratic-Republican
| 1815 
|  | Incumbent retired.New member elected.Democratic-Republican hold.
| nowrap | 

|-
! 
| Josiah Hasbrouck
|  | Democratic-Republican
| 18021816
|  | Incumbent retired.New member elected.Democratic-Republican hold.
| nowrap | 

|-
! 
| Dorrance Kirtland
|  | Democratic-Republican
| 1816
|  | Incumbent retired.New member elected.Democratic-Republican hold.
| nowrap | 

|-
! 
| Rensselaer Westerlo
|  | Federalist
| 1816
|  | Incumbent retired.New member elected.Federalist hold.
| nowrap | 

|-
! 
| John P. Cushman
|  | Federalist
| 1816
|  | Incumbent retired.New member elected.Federalist hold.
| nowrap | 

|-
! 
| John W. Taylor
|  | Democratic-Republican
| 1812
| Incumbent re-elected.
| nowrap | 

|-
! rowspan=2 | 
| John Savage
|  | Democratic-Republican
| 1814
|  | Incumbent retired.New member elected.Democratic-Republican hold.
| rowspan=2 nowrap | 

|-
| John Palmer
|  | Democratic-Republican
| 1816
|  | Incumbent retired.New member elected.Democratic-Republican hold.

|-
! 
| Thomas Lawyer
|  | Democratic-Republican
| 1816
|  | Incumbent retired.New member elected.Democratic-Republican hold.
| nowrap | 

|-
! 
| John Herkimer
|  | Democratic-Republican
| 1816
|  | Incumbent retired.New member elected.Democratic-Republican hold.
| nowrap | 

|-
! rowspan=2 | 
| Isaac Williams Jr.
|  | Democratic-Republican
| 1813 1814 1816
|  | Incumbent retired.New member elected.Democratic-Republican hold.
| rowspan=2 nowrap | 

|-
| John R. Drake
|  | Democratic-Republican
| 1816
|  | Incumbent retired.New member elected.Democratic-Republican hold.

|-
! 
| Henry R. Storrs
|  | Federalist
| 1816
| Incumbent re-elected.
| nowrap | 

|-
! 
| Thomas H. Hubbard
|  | Democratic-Republican
| 1816
|  | Incumbent retired.New member elected.Democratic-Republican hold.
| nowrap | 

|-
! 
| David A. Ogden
|  | Federalist
| 1816
|  | Incumbent retired.New member elected.Democratic-Republican gain.
| nowrap | 

|-
! 
| James Porter
|  | Democratic-Republican
| 1816
|  | Incumbent retired.New member elected.Democratic-Republican hold.
| nowrap | 

|-
! rowspan=2 | 
| Daniel Cruger
|  | Democratic-Republican
| 1816
|  | Incumbent retired.New member elected.Democratic-Republican hold.
| rowspan=2 nowrap | 

|-
| Oliver C. Comstock
|  | Democratic-Republican
| 1812
|  | Incumbent retired.New member elected.Democratic-Republican hold.

|-
! rowspan=2 | 
| Benjamin Ellicott
|  | Democratic-Republican
| 1816
|  | Incumbent lost re-election.New member elected.Democratic-Republican hold.
| rowspan=2 nowrap | 

|-
| John C. Spencer
|  | Democratic-Republican
| 1816
|  | Incumbent retired.New member elected.Democratic-Republican hold.

|}

North Carolina 

North Carolina elected its members August 12, 1819, after the new congress began but before the first session convened.

|-
! 
| Lemuel Sawyer
|  | Democratic-Republican
| 18061813 1817
| Incumbent re-elected.
| nowrap | 

|-
! 
| Joseph H. Bryan
|  | Democratic-Republican
| 1815
|  | Incumbent retired.New member elected.Democratic-Republican hold.
| nowrap | 

|-
! 
| Thomas H. Hall
|  | Democratic-Republican
| 1817
| Incumbent re-elected.
| nowrap | 

|-
! 
| Jesse Slocumb
|  | Federalist
| 1817
| Incumbent re-elected.
| nowrap | 

|-
! 
| James Owen
|  | Democratic-Republican
| 1817
|  | Incumbent retired.New member elected.Democratic-Republican hold.
| nowrap | 

|-
! 
| Weldon N. Edwards
|  | Democratic-Republican
| 1816 
| Incumbent re-elected.
| nowrap | 

|-
! 
| James Stewart
|  | Democratic-Republican
| 1818 
|  | Incumbent lost re-election.New member elected.Federalist gain.
| nowrap | 

|-
! 
| James S. Smith
|  | Democratic-Republican
| 1817
| Incumbent re-elected.
| nowrap | 

|-
! 
| Thomas Settle
|  | Democratic-Republican
| 1817
| Incumbent re-elected.
| nowrap | 

|-
! 
| Charles Fisher
|  | Democratic-Republican
| 1819 
| Incumbent re-elected.
| nowrap | 

|-
! 
| William Davidson
|  | Federalist
| 1818 
| Incumbent re-elected.
| nowrap | 

|-
! 
| Felix Walker
|  | Democratic-Republican
| 1817
| Incumbent re-elected.
| nowrap | 

|-
! 
| Lewis Williams
|  | Democratic-Republican
| 1815
| Incumbent re-elected.
| nowrap | 

|}

Ohio 

Ohio elected its members October 13, 1818.

|-
! 
| William Henry Harrison
|  | Democratic-Republican
| 1816
|  | Incumbent retired.New member elected.Democratic-Republican hold.
| nowrap | 

|-
! 
| John W. Campbell
|  | Democratic-Republican
| 1816
| Incumbent re-elected.
| nowrap | 

|-
! 
| Levi Barber
|  | Democratic-Republican
| 1816
|  | Incumbent lost re-election.New member elected.Democratic-Republican hold.
| nowrap | 

|-
! 
| Samuel Herrick
|  | Democratic-Republican
| 1816
| Incumbent re-elected.
| nowrap | 

|-
! 
| Philemon Beecher
|  | Federalist
| 1816
| Incumbent re-elected.
| nowrap | 

|-
! 
| Peter Hitchcock
|  | Democratic-Republican
| 1816
|  | Incumbent lost re-election.New member elected.Democratic-Republican hold.
| nowrap | 

|}

Pennsylvania 

Pennsylvania elected its members October 13, 1818.

|-
! rowspan=4 | 
| John Sergeant
|  | Federalist
| 1815 
| Incumbent re-elected.
| rowspan=4 nowrap | 

|-
| Adam Seybert
|  | Democratic-Republican
| 18081814 1816
|  | Incumbent retired.New member elected.Federalist gain.

|-
| William Anderson
|  | Democratic-Republican
| 18081814 1816
|  | Incumbent retired.New member elected.Federalist gain.

|-
| Joseph Hopkinson
|  | Federalist
| 1814
|  | Incumbent retired.New member elected.Federalist hold.

|-
! rowspan=2 | 
| Levi Pawling
|  | Federalist
| 1816
|  | Incumbent lost re-election.New member elected.Democratic-Republican gain.
| rowspan=2 nowrap | 

|-
| Isaac Darlington
|  | Federalist
| 1816
|  | Incumbent retired.New member elected.Democratic-Republican gain.

|-
! rowspan=2 | 
| James M. Wallace
|  | Democratic-Republican
| 1815 
| Incumbent re-elected.
| rowspan=2 nowrap | 

|-
| John Whiteside
|  | Democratic-Republican
| 1814
|  | Incumbent lost re-election.New member elected.Democratic-Republican hold.

|-
! 
| Jacob Spangler
|  | Democratic-Republican
| 1816
|  | Incumbent resigned April 20, 1818.New member elected.Democratic-Republican hold.Successor also elected to finish the current term.
| nowrap | 

|-
! rowspan=2 | 
| Andrew Boden
|  | Democratic-Republican
| 1816
| Incumbent re-elected.
| rowspan=2 nowrap | 

|-
| William Maclay
|  | Democratic-Republican
| 1814
|  | Incumbent retired.New member elected.Democratic-Republican hold.

|-
! rowspan=2 | 
| Samuel D. Ingham
|  | Democratic-Republican
| 1818 
|  | Incumbent resigned July 6, 1818.New member elected.Democratic-Republican hold.Successor also elected the same day to finish the current term.
| rowspan=2 nowrap | 

|-
| Thomas J. Rogers
|  | Democratic-Republican
| 1818 
| Incumbent re-elected.

|-
! 
| Joseph Hiester
|  | Democratic-Republican
| 17981804 1814
| Incumbent re-elected.
| nowrap | 

|-
! 
| Alexander Ogle
|  | Democratic-Republican
| 1816
|  | Incumbent retired.New member elected.Democratic-Republican hold.
| nowrap | 

|-
! 
| William P. Maclay
|  | Democratic-Republican
| 1816
| Incumbent re-elected.
| nowrap | 

|-
! rowspan=2 | 
| William Wilson
|  | Democratic-Republican
| 1814
|  | Incumbent retired.New member elected.Democratic-Republican hold.
| rowspan=2 nowrap | 

|-
| John Murray
|  | Democratic-Republican
| 1817 
| Incumbent re-elected.

|-
! 
| David Marchand
|  | Democratic-Republican
| 1816
| Incumbent re-elected.
| nowrap | 

|-
! 
| Thomas Patterson
|  | Democratic-Republican
| 1816
| Incumbent re-elected.
| nowrap | 

|-
! 
| Christian Tarr
|  | Democratic-Republican
| 1816
| Incumbent re-elected.
| nowrap | 

|-
! 
| Henry Baldwin
|  | Democratic-Republican
| 1816
| Incumbent re-elected.
| nowrap | 

|-
! 
| Robert Moore
|  | Democratic-Republican
| 1816
| Incumbent re-elected.
| nowrap | 

|}

Rhode Island 

Rhode Island elected its members August 25, 1818.

|-
! rowspan=2 | 
| John L. Boss Jr.
|  | Federalist
| 1814
|  | Incumbent retired.New member elected.Democratic-Republican gain.
| rowspan=2 nowrap | 

|-
| James B. Mason
|  | Federalist
| 1814
|  | Incumbent retired.New member elected.Democratic-Republican gain.

|}

South Carolina 

South Carolina elected its members October 12–13, 1818.

|-
! 
| Henry Middleton
|  | Democratic-Republican
| 1814
|  | Incumbent retired.New member elected.Democratic-Republican hold.
| nowrap | 

|-
! 
| William Lowndes
|  | Democratic-Republican
| 1810
| Incumbent re-elected.
| nowrap | 

|-
! 
| James Ervin
|  | Democratic-Republican
| 1816
| Incumbent re-elected.
| nowrap | 

|-
! 
| Joseph Bellinger
|  | Democratic-Republican
| 1816
|  | Incumbent retired.New member elected.Democratic-Republican hold.
| nowrap | 

|-
! 
| Starling Tucker
|  | Democratic-Republican
| 1816
| Incumbent re-elected.
| nowrap | 

|-
! 
| Eldred Simkins
|  | Democratic-Republican
| 1818 
| Incumbent re-elected.
| nowrap | 

|-
! 
| Elias Earle
|  | Democratic-Republican
| 18041814 1816
| Incumbent re-elected.
| nowrap | 

|-
! 
| Wilson Nesbitt
|  | Democratic-Republican
| 1816
|  | Incumbent retired.New member elected.Democratic-Republican hold.
| nowrap | 

|-
! 
| Stephen D. Miller
|  | Democratic-Republican
| 1816
|  | Incumbent retired.New member elected.Democratic-Republican hold.
| nowrap | 

|}

Tennessee 

Tennessee elected its members August 5–6, 1819, after the new congress began but before the first session convened.

|-
! 
| John Rhea
|  | Democratic-Republican
| 18031815 1817
| Incumbent re-elected.
| nowrap | 

|-
! 
| William G. Blount
|  | Democratic-Republican
| 1815 
|  | Incumbent retired.New member elected.Democratic-Republican hold.
| nowrap | 

|-
! 
| Francis Jones
|  | Democratic-Republican
| 1817
| Incumbent re-elected.
| nowrap | 

|-
! 
| Samuel E. Hogg
|  | Democratic-Republican
| 1817
|  | Incumbent retired.New member elected.Democratic-Republican hold.
| nowrap | 

|-
! 
| Thomas Claiborne
|  | Democratic-Republican
| 1817
|  | Incumbent retired.New member elected.Democratic-Republican hold.
| nowrap | 

|-
! 
| George W. L. Marr
|  | Democratic-Republican
| 1817
|  | Incumbent retired.New member elected.Democratic-Republican hold.
| nowrap | 

|}

Vermont 

Vermont elected its members September 1, 1818.

|-
! rowspan=6 | 
| Charles Rich
|  | Democratic-Republican
| 18121814 1816
| Incumbent re-elected.
| rowspan=6 nowrap | 

|-
| Mark Richards
|  | Democratic-Republican
| 1816
| Incumbent re-elected.

|-
| Samuel C. Crafts
|  | Democratic-Republican
| 1816
| Incumbent re-elected.

|-
| Heman Allen
|  | Democratic-Republican
| 1816
|  | Incumbent resigned April 20, 1818 to become a U.S. Marshall.New member elected.Democratic-Republican hold.

|-
| William Hunter
|  | Democratic-Republican
| 1816
|  | Incumbent lost re-election.New member elected.Democratic-Republican hold.

|-
| Orsamus Cook Merrill
|  | Democratic-Republican
| 1816
| Incumbent re-elected.Election later contested successfully by Rollin C. Mallary.

|}

Virginia 

Virginia elected its members in April 1819, after the new congress began but before the first session convened.

|-
! 
| James Pindall
|  | Federalist
| 1817
| Incumbent re-elected.
| nowrap | 

|-
! 
| Edward Colston
|  | Federalist
| 1817
|  | Incumbent lost re-election.New member elected.Federalist hold.
| nowrap | 

|-
! 
| Henry St. George Tucker
|  | Democratic-Republican
| 1815
|  | Incumbent retired.New member elected.Democratic-Republican hold.
| nowrap | 

|-
! 
| William McCoy
|  | Democratic-Republican
| 1811
| Incumbent re-elected.
| nowrap | 

|-
! 
| John Floyd
|  | Democratic-Republican
| 1817
| Incumbent re-elected.
| nowrap | 

|-
! 
| Alexander Smyth
|  | Democratic-Republican
| 1817
| Incumbent re-elected.
| nowrap | 

|-
! 
| Ballard Smith
|  | Democratic-Republican
| 1815
| Incumbent re-elected.
| nowrap | 

|-
! 
| Charles F. Mercer
|  | Federalist
| 1817
| Incumbent re-elected.
| nowrap | 

|-
! 
| William Lee Ball
|  | Democratic-Republican
| 1817
| Incumbent re-elected.
| nowrap | 

|-
! 
| George Strother
|  | Democratic-Republican
| 1817
| Incumbent re-elected.
| nowrap | 

|-
! 
| Philip P. Barbour
|  | Democratic-Republican
| 1814 
| Incumbent re-elected.
| nowrap | 

|-
! 
| Robert S. Garnett
|  | Democratic-Republican
| 1817
| Incumbent re-elected.
| nowrap | 

|-
! 
| Burwell Bassett
|  | Democratic-Republican
| 18051812 1815
|  | Incumbent retired.New member elected.Democratic-Republican hold.
| nowrap | 

|-
! 
| William A. Burwell
|  | Democratic-Republican
| 1806 
| Incumbent re-elected.
| nowrap | 

|-
! 
| William J. Lewis
|  | Democratic-Republican
| 1817
|  | Incumbent retired.New member elected.Democratic-Republican hold.
| nowrap | 

|-
! 
| Archibald Austin
|  | Democratic-Republican
| 1817
|  | Incumbent lost re-election.New member elected.Democratic-Republican hold.
| nowrap | 

|-
! 
| James Pleasants
|  | Democratic-Republican
| 1811
| Incumbent re-elected.
| nowrap | 

|-
! 
| Thomas M. Nelson
|  | Democratic-Republican
| 1816 
|  | Incumbent retired.New member elected.Democratic-Republican hold.
| nowrap | 

|-
! 
| John Pegram
|  | Democratic-Republican
| 1818 
|  | Incumbent lost re-election.New member elected.Democratic-Republican hold.
| nowrap | 

|-
! 
| James Johnson
|  | Democratic-Republican
| 1813
| Incumbent re-elected.
| nowrap | 

|-
! 
| Thomas Newton Jr.
|  | Democratic-Republican
| 1797
| Incumbent re-elected.
| nowrap | 

|-
! 
| Hugh Nelson
|  | Democratic-Republican
| 1811
| Incumbent re-elected.
| nowrap | 

|-
! 
| John Tyler
|  | Democratic-Republican
| 1816 
| Incumbent re-elected.
| nowrap | 

|}

Non-voting delegates 
There were four territories with the right to send non-voting delegates to at least part of the 16th Congress, two of which, Michigan Territory and Arkansas Territory were new to this Congress.

|-
! 
| colspan=3 | None (District created)
| New seat.New member elected January 29, 1818 and seated March 9, 1818.Member later elected to the new state, see above.
| nowrap | 

|-
! 
| colspan=3 | None (District created)
| Arkansas Territory organized July 4, 1819.New delegate elected in 1819.New delegate seated December 21, 1819.
| nowrap | 

|-
! 
| colspan=3 | None (District created)
| New seat.New delegate elected October 28, 1819 and seated March 2, 1820.
| nowrap | 

|-
! 
| John Scott
| 
| 18161817 1817 
| Incumbent re-elected.
| nowrap | 

|}

See also 
 1818 United States elections
 List of United States House of Representatives elections (1789–1822)
 1818–19 United States Senate elections
 15th United States Congress
 16th United States Congress

Notes

References

Bibliography

External links 
 Office of the Historian (Office of Art & Archives, Office of the Clerk, U.S. House of Representatives)